Luis Sagasti (born 1963) is an Argentine writer and art critic. He was born in Bahía Blanca and studied history at the Universidad Nacional del Sur where he now teaches. He published his first novel in 1999, and is best known for his 2011 novel Bellas Artes which was translated into English as Fireflies.

Selected works 
 
 El Canon de Leipzig (Ediciones Simurg, 1999) Leipzig's Canon 
 Los mares de la Luna (Editorial Sudamericana, 2006) Seas of the Moon 
 Bellas Artes (Eterna Cadencia, 2011) Fireflies 
 Perdidos en el espacio: Un ensayo sobre el fin de la historia en la Argentina (Capital Intelectual, 2011) Lost in Space 
 Maelstrom (Eterna Cadencia, 2015) 
 El arte de la fuga (treintayseis, 2016) 
 Una ofrenda musical (Eterna Cadencia, 2017) A Musical Offering 
 Cybertlön (Tenemos las Máquinas, 2018) 
 Por qué escuchamos a Led Zeppelin (Gourmet Musical, 2019) 
 Leyden Ltd. (Eterna Cadencia, 2019)

References

Living people
Argentine writers
1963 births